Cemaes Rural District was an administrative subdivision of Pembrokeshire, Wales from 1934 to 1974.

Name
The district's name is that of its northernmost point, the promontory Cemaes Head, though it may also hark back to the Cantref of Cemais, which existed from Norman times, and as the Hundred of Cemais from the 16th century.

Formation
Cemaes Rural District was formed in 1934 by the amalgamation of St Dogmells Rural District and Llanfyrnach Rural District. The council was administered from Cardigan, outside its area.

Purpose
The Council comprised councillors and a chairman, and its responsibilities included sanitary services, sewerage, refuse collection, maintaining local roads, cemeteries and parks, licensing of public entertainments, water supply and housing. It became a rating authority in 1925. Rural District Councils were administered by a number of committees and by appointed officers including a Clerk, Treasurer, Public Health Inspector, Housing Officer, Surveyor and Rating Officer.

Abolition
It was abolished in 1974, when it was absorbed into the Preseli District of Dyfed.

References

Rural districts of Wales
History of Pembrokeshire